Pissy is a commune in the Somme department in Hauts-de-France in northern France.

Geography

Population

Places of interest
 The church
 The château,
 The mairie
 War memorial
 Two stone wells

See also
Communes of the Somme department

References

Communes of Somme (department)